Amber Mary Bain (born 13 July 1995), known professionally as The Japanese House, is an English indie pop musician from Buckinghamshire. Bain contributes vocals and plays guitar, synthesizer and keyboard for her music. As a teenager, Bain decided to pursue a career in music, having been taught music by her father during childhood. She began writing music under the moniker the Japanese House in 2012, after being introduced to Matty Healy of the 1975, who offered to help produce her music under the label Dirty Hit. She first rose to prominence after the release of her first single, "Still", which was a critical success and premiered on BBC Radio 1 presented by Zane Lowe.

Bain's androgynous vocals, heavy use of production, and elusive media presence fuelled fan speculation about her gender and identity after her first few singles were released. In 2015, Bain released her debut EP Pools to Bathe In and the follow-up EP Clean. These first two EPs were rooted in indie pop and synth-pop, and included experimentation with genres such as dream pop, folktronica, and electropop. She toured with Dirty Hit labelmates the 1975 and Wolf Alice in 2015 and 2016 before headlining tours of her own.

Her third EP, Swim Against the Tide (2016) was influenced by 80s synthpop and technopop. Her fourth EP, Saw You in a Dream (2017) saw her continued experimentation with different genres of electronica and rock. Bain co-produced her first full-length album Good at Falling (2019) with George Daniel and American record producer BJ Burton. Her fifth EP, The LA Sessions (2019), featured live recordings of reimagined tracks from Good at Falling and Saw You in a Dream.

Early life 
Bain is from Buckinghamshire, England. As a child she was taught music by her father, who was also a musician. She continued practising and recording music throughout her childhood. She began recording music at the age of eleven, when she visited her father's house. As a teenager Bain decided to pursue a career in music rather than going to university, a decision which her father supported as he felt she had "a clear opportunity".

Career

2012–2015: Early career, Pools to Bathe In and Clean 
In 2012 Bain's friend introduced her to singer Matty Healy of the 1975, who Bain's friend was dating. Bain began working closely with the 1975, and signed to their label Dirty Hit.

Bain settled on the stage name The Japanese House because she did not feel ready to reveal her name or gender. As a result, very little was known about The Japanese House when her debut single "Still" was premiered on BBC Radio 1 with Zane Lowe on 2 March 2015.

Bain's androgynous voice and avoidance of press photography fuelled speculation about her gender and identity. After the release of "Still", there was widespread speculation that the singer behind The Japanese House was a man, and some fans even speculated that it was a side project of Healy's. Bain went on her first tour as an opening act for The 1975 in 2015. Bain subsequently released three more singles. "Pools to Bathe In" was released on 25 March 2015, "Teeth" on 8 April 2015, and "Sister" on 21 April 2015. Bain's first EP Pools to Bathe In, a compilation of her four previous singles, was released on 27 April 2015 to favourable reviews.

The titular single from the EP Clean was released on 7 September 2015 and premiered on BBC Radio 1 that same day. The EP's second single, "Cool Blue" was released 15 September, followed by "Letter by the Water" on 27 October 2015. The final single, "Sugar Pill" was released on 3 November 2015. Clean was released on 6 November 2015, and received positive reviews from critics.

2016–2017: Swim Against the Tide and Saw You in a Dream 
On 26 September 2016 Bain released "Face Like Thunder", the first single from her upcoming EP Swim Against the Tide. Bain stated that the EP's title was inspired by the feeling of falling in love and losing someone, saying "[it] feels like you’re swimming against the tide. In a sense it’s a struggle". The track received favourable reviews for its emotional subject matter and melodic beat.

Bain released Swim Against the Tide on 11 November 2016. She supported the 1975 on their 2016 North American tour to promote their second album, I Like It When You Sleep, for You Are So Beautiful yet So Unaware of It. The Japanese House headlined a North American tour beginning on 21 February 2017 and ending on 28 March.

On 26 April 2017 Bain released the single "Saw You in a Dream". The single was noted for using fewer layered tracks, and having a starker, less production heavy sound than many of Bain's previous songs. The full EP Saw You in a Dream was originally scheduled for release on 16 June 2017 but was released on 30 June. The EP was praised for showcasing the evolution of Bain's dreamy style, with strong vocals and a more reserved use of production effects.

2018–present: Good at Falling and Chewing Cotton Wool 
Bain released the single "Lilo" on 27 September 2018. After the release of "Lilo", The Japanese House announced a North American tour in December 2019. On 12 November 2018 Bain released "Follow My Girl", the album's second single. That same day, Billboard announced that The Japanese House's debut album Good at Falling was to be released on 1 March 2019. The album was co-produced with George Daniel (of the 1975) and BJ Burton.

Upon its release, Good at Falling received mostly positive reviews. Megan Buerger of Pitchfork called it "confident and intoxicating", although she commented that its melancholic lyrical content almost exasperated her at points. Bain announced her second Good at Falling tour in the US for October and November 2019.

Bain released the EP The LA Sessions on 8 August 2019. The LA Sessions featured re-imagined tracks from Good at Falling and Saw You in a Dream which were recorded live in Los Angeles. On 27 September 2019, Bain released a single titled "Something Has to Change", and announced an upcoming extended play of the same name. The EP was announced to be released in November 2019, but was delayed into early 2020. On 22 November 2019, she released a single titled "Chewing Cotton Wool." On 10 August 2020, Bain announced that the EP, now titled Chewing Cotton Wool, was to be released on 12 August 2020. Bain released the EP on 12 August 2020. It featured four songs, one of which was a collaboration with Justin Vernon of indie folk band Bon Iver, as well as the previously released singles. Upon its release, Chewing Cotton Wool received praise for showing further growth of Bain's signature lush, hazy production, introducing more textured and sporadic electronics.

Public image and anonymity 

Bain began producing music professionally under the pen name "The Japanese House". She has stated that her reasons for using a pseudonym include not wanting to be defined by her gender and wanting to avoid the public eye. The name "The Japanese House" was inspired by a property in Cornwall, England in which she and her family had vacationed during her childhood.

The property had been previously owned by Kate Winslet, with furnishings reminiscent of traditional Japanese tea houses, which inspired Bain's musical moniker. During her week-long stay in the cottage, Bain posed as a boy, calling herself Danny. Her experiences there directly inspired the use of an anonymous label for her music as opposed to the use of her own name.

During her early career, Bain avoided photo shoots and publicity which, combined with her androgynous vocals, led many outlets to label her as an anonymous artist. After the release of her debut EP Pools to Bathe In, fans speculated about her gender and identity, with some even claiming that The Japanese House was Matty Healy of the 1975.

Despite the shroud of anonymity which surrounded The Japanese House, Bain never hid her personal identity online. In a 2019 interview she noted that her official social media accounts even used her full name, Amber Bain. She eventually became more public, appearing in interviews and photo shoots, stating that the reason for this was that she had become more comfortable with being in the spotlight and "didn't want the mystery to become bigger than the music".

Amber Bain is known for her androgynous style and wavy blond hair which has been compared to that of American musician Kurt Cobain. Megan Buerger of Pitchfork described Bain at the beginning of her career as "a soft-spoken, queer 19-year-old girl with Kurt Cobain hair and boyish style".

Artistry

Influences 
Bain has been compared to pop acts with strong melodic styles such as the xx, the Beatles, and the Beach Boys. She has been compared to the 1975 with whom she has toured, particularly band members Matty Healy and George Daniel who helped produce many of her tracks. Bain has cited musicians like Brian Wilson, Blondie, Bon Iver, and Franki Valli & the Four Seasons as influences on her work. In a 2019 interview with W Magazine, she described herself as "a modern day, more depressing ABBA".

Musical style and themes 

Pools to Bathe In was a synth-pop album, and her subsequent releases have prominently incorporated synth-pop. Her experimental musical style also contains dream pop, electropop, synth-pop, indie pop, and alt pop. Andy Meek of Billboard described Bain's discography as a combination of experimental electronica and "catchy pop hooks backed by drums and chugging guitars".

Her later releases were increasingly influenced by art pop and rock music. Saw You in a Dream was a yacht rock album, while Good at Falling was influenced by rock and art pop. She is known for her atmospheric tracks and moody lyrical themes. Max Migowksi, writing for Indie Mag, summarized Bain's musical style as "[an] androgynous voice embedded in ethereal, post-indie pop synths with hints at gentle acoustic guitar".

Many of Bain's releases explore themes such as love, loss, solitude, and personal growth. Her later releases have been favorably compared to her first two EPs, with critics noting the more mature lyrics and refined composition of Swim Against the Tide and Good at Falling. Bain's debut album Good at Falling was praised by its critics for its dark, heartfelt lyrics and light, pop melodies.

Voice 
Bain's singing voice has been compared to both contralto and tenor, and has been especially noted for its androgyny. Critics have favorably compared her vocals to Victoria Legrand and Imogen Heap, though Bain rejects comparisons to Heap. A distinctive feature of Bain's discography is her use of layered harmonies, often three tracks or more, which simulates the effect of a vocoder. Her use of overlapping harmonies to create "a kind of thick, organic Auto-tune [sic]" has been praised for lending depth to her tracks. Alice French of Varsity called Bain's vocals one of the highlights of her performance.

Personal life 
At the time of a 2015 article, Bain resided in East London, and has a pet German Shepherd named Calvin. She has been open about her struggle with alcohol abuse, and stated that she became sober after the release of Good at Falling. The song "Maybe You're the Reason" from Good at Falling deals with her past struggles with an eating disorder, and this subject is also depicted in the music video for "Lilo". Bain was in a four-year relationship with singer-songwriter Marika Hackman until 2018. Hackman later appeared in the music video for "Lilo". At the time of a 2019 interview with W Magazine, Bain stated that she was in a three-way polyamorous relationship. 

Bain has stated that, although she previously felt that being gay explained her gender expression, due to changing perceptions of sexuality, "maybe [she] would identify as nonbinary now, because [she doesn't] feel fully female."

Discography

Studio albums

Extended plays

Singles

Music videos

References

External links 

 

Year of birth missing (living people)
Living people
 
British indie pop musicians
English electronic musicians
English women singer-songwriters
Women guitarists
English lesbian musicians
English LGBT singers
English LGBT songwriters
Singers from London
English women in electronic music
21st-century English women singers
Lesbian singers
Lesbian songwriters
Musicians from Buckinghamshire
Dirty Hit artists
21st-century LGBT people